Clarence Abiathar Waldo (January 21, 1852 – October 1, 1926) was an American mathematician, author and educator today most famous for the role he played in the Indiana Pi Bill affair.

Life and career
Born in Hammond, New York, Waldo married Abby Wright Allen (1856–?) in Stamford, Connecticut in 1881.  In 1884 they had a daughter, Alice.

Waldo received his A.B. (1875) and A.M. (1878) degrees from Wesleyan University and his Ph.D. (1894) from Syracuse University.

A member of Sigma Xi and Phi Beta Kappa, he was tutor at the Department of Mathematics of Wesleyan University from 1877 to 1881. Subsequently, he was professor of mathematics (from 1883 to 1891), librarian, and twice Acting President (from 1885 to 1886 and 1888 to 1889) at Rose Polytechnic Institute of Terre Haute, Indiana; professor of mathematics at DePauw University of Greencastle, Indiana from 1891 to 1895; head professor of mathematics at Purdue University of West Lafayette, Indiana from 1895 to 1898; professor of mathematics (1908 to 1910), Thayer Professor of Mathematics and Applied Mechanics, head of the Department of Mathematics (1910 to 1917), and Professor Emeritus (after 1917) at Washington University in St. Louis.

In 1888 Waldo published A manual of descriptive geometry, with numerous problems.

Waldo was a charter member of the Indiana Academy of Science and served as the Academy's president in 1897.  He achieved a modicum of fame that year when he explained to members of the Indiana State Senate why a bill that would redefine the value of pi and attempt to square the circle should not be adopted.

Book
 Clarence A. Waldo, A manual of descriptive geometry, with numerous problems,  Boston: D.C. Heath and Co.,  1888, 1895, 77 pages.

References
  
Weslayan University Science Faculty, 1831-1961
Visher, Stephen Sargent, Indiana Scientists: A Biographical Directory and an Analysis, Indianapolis: Indiana Academy of Science, 1951.

External links
 History of Wesleyan University
 Book information on A manual of descriptive geometry
 Waldo's genealogy at RootsWeb.com
 

1852 births
1926 deaths
19th-century American mathematicians
20th-century American mathematicians
American textbook writers
American male non-fiction writers
Wesleyan University alumni
Syracuse University alumni
DePauw University faculty
Purdue University faculty
Washington University in St. Louis faculty
Washington University in St. Louis mathematicians
People from St. Lawrence County, New York
19th-century male writers
Mathematicians from New York (state)